Bladet Vesterålen is a Norwegian daily newspaper published in Sortland, Norway. It is the predominant newspaper in Vesterålen.

History and profile
The newspaper was founded in 1921, and its first editor was Casper Rønning. As of 2022 the editor-in-chief is Karl-Einar Nordahl.

References

External links

1921 establishments in Norway
Newspapers established in 1921
Daily newspapers published in Norway
Norwegian-language newspapers